Thyrocopa sapindiella, the Oahu aulu thyrocopa moth, is a moth of the family Xyloryctidae. It was first described by Otto Swezey in 1913. It is endemic to the Hawaiian island of Oahu. It may be extinct.

The length of the forewings is about 9 mm. Adults are on wing at least in November. The ground color of the forewings is very light whitish brown, with a few brown scales scattered throughout. The discal area has one very small, faint brownish spot in the cell. The hindwings are very light whitish brown.

Larvae have been recorded feeding on Abutilon species and the leaves of Sapindus species. Caterpillars are quite numerous on some trees. Early instars feed on the under surface of leaves, each producing a web covered with frass under which it feeds, eating the surface of the leaf. Later instars hide in leaves rolled together, often several leaves in a bunch fastened together, and there may be two or more caterpillars per bunch, each in a silken tunnel. Early instars are yellowish or pale green. Full-grown larvae are about 30 mm and pale yellowish with pale brown markings.

The pupa is about 9 mm and medium brown. The pupa is formed within the spun-together leaves where the caterpillar fed.

External links

Thyrocopa
Endemic moths of Hawaii
Moths described in 1913